The Irony of Fate 2 or The Irony of Fate: Continuation (Ironiya sud’by. Prodolzheniye) is a 2007 Russian romantic comedy film directed by Timur Bekmambetov based on a screenplay by Aleksey Slapovsky produced by Channel One and released by Mosfilm. It is a direct sequel of the first The Irony of Fate.

It was originally rumored to be put in production in a press release, dedicated to the original movie's 30th anniversary in 2005.

The film grossed $55 million, with $50 million coming from the Russian box-office alone.

Plot
The characters from the first film now have children who have managed to get into the same situation as their parents many years ago. However, the story is not simply a remake of the original movie. All of the adventures in the previous film were accidental, but here everything is done according to a plan thought up by Pavlik, a friend of Evgeniy Lukashin.

Pavlik's idea is to help his friend Evgeniy with his loneliness so he dispatches Lukashin's son to St. Petersburg, where he acts in the same manner as his father 30 years ago. In flat 12, he meets Nadezhda, who is actually the daughter of Nadezhda from the first film. She has a fiancé called Irakliy, a businessman. Kostantin's task is to lure Irakliy away from the flat and then wait for Nadezhda's mother to come; he then makes her call Evgeniy Lukashin. Pavlik persuades Evgeniy to go to St Petersburg.

The plot becomes a story of two fights over a woman: Konstantin vs. Irakliy and Evgeniy vs. Ippolit. In the end Lukashin overcomes the competition because Irakliy turns out to be too tedious for Nadya, and Nadezhda understands that she was never truly in love with Ippolit.

Cast

Main cast
 Konstantin Khabensky as Kostya (the son of Zhenya and Galya)
 Elizaveta Boyarskaya as Nadya (the daughter of Ippolit and Nadezhda)
 Sergey Bezrukov as Irakliy Petrovich Izmaylov, Nadya's fiancé
 Andrey Myagkov as Evgeniy Mikhaylovich Lukashin (Zhenya)
 Barbara Brylska as Nadezhda Vasilyevna Sheveleva 
 Yuri Yakovlev as Ippolit Georgievich, Nadezhda's ex-boyfriend

Supporting cast
 Mikhail Yefremov as Ded Moroz
 Yevgenia Dobrovolskaya as Snegurochka
 Valentina Talyzina as Valya, Nadezhda's best friend
 Alexander Schirvindt as Pavlik, Zhenya's friend
 Dato Bakhtadze as Artur, Nadya's neighbour
 Ramaz Chkhikvadze Jr. as Artur's son
 Sergei Rubeko as the man with the New Year tree
 Eldar Ryazanov as Kostya's seatmate in the plane (cameo role)
 Anna Semenovich as the woman at the airport
 Viktor Verzhbitsky as the mystery man at the bus stop
 Ville Haapasalo as the drunken Finn
 Roman Madyanov as Mamontov, the police officer
 Valery Barinov

Production
Almost all of the lead actors from the first film appeared in the sequel, except for Georgi Burkov, Liya Akhedzhakova and Olga Naumenko.

Burkov died in 1990. Akhedzhakova refused to take part in the film. Naumenko agreed to the filming, but managed to be in only one episode. Later, her schedule did not coincide with the director's and further shooting did not take place which led to her being cut from the final version of the film.

Initially Milla Jovovich was invited for the role of Nadya, but she read the script and refused. In an interview Jovovich stated that she declined to appear in the film because she was apprehensive about acting in Russian, because her main language is English. However four years later she did act in Russian — in the 2011 film Lucky Trouble alongside Khabensky, also produced by Bekmambetov.

Release
The film opened 21 December 2007 in Russia in 903 theatres, the widest opening in Russia at the time.

Reception
The film received positive reviews from Film.ru, Time Out, KG, Kinomania and a number of other publications. Online newspaper Lenta.ru praised the films cast, humor and atmosphere but criticized the picture for excessive product placement.

The film grossed a record $35.7 million in its first two weeks of release and went on to gross $50 million in Russia and $55 million worldwide.

Awards
The film received three prizes at the MTV Russia Movie Awards — Best Film, Best Actor (Sergei Bezrukov) and Best Comedy Actor (Konstantin Khabensky).

References

External links
 
 

2007 films
2007 romantic comedy-drama films
Russian romantic comedy-drama films
Films directed by Timur Bekmambetov
Films scored by Yuri Poteyenko
Films shot in Moscow
2000s Russian-language films
Russian sequel films
Films set around New Year
2007 comedy films
2007 drama films
Bazelevs Company films